The Ireland women's national rugby league team is organised by Rugby League Ireland and represents Ireland in international rugby league. 

Ireland first fielded a women's Rugby League team in October 2021, winning their inaugural Test Match against Wales.

Players
The table below lists the team for the Test Match against , played on Tuesday, 25 October in Wigan, with their jersey numbers for that match. The side is coached by John Whalley.

Results

Full internationals 

Upcoming Fixtures:
 During 2023 and 2024 Ireland are drawn to play the following three teams in Group B of the European Qualifiers for the 2025 Women's Rugby League  World Cup. Dates and hosts have been selected but the venues are yet to be announced.
  on 28 Oct 2023 in Serbia
  on 11 May 2024 in Ireland
  on 18 May 2024 in Malta

See also

 Rugby league in Ireland
 Rugby League Ireland
 Ireland women's national rugby union team

References

 
Women's national rugby league teams
Women's national sports teams of Ireland